In computing, focus stealing is a mode error occurring when a program not in focus (e.g. minimized or operating in background) places a window in the foreground and redirects all keyboard input to that window. This is considered to be an annoyance or hazard to some users because the program may steal the focus while the user is typing, causing keystrokes to go to the newly focused window, possibly being lost or causing an unintended effect therein.  This may be a few keystrokes due to reaction time, or may be more if the user's attention is not on the computer screen, e.g. typing while looking at the keyboard or while reading copy to the side, or if processor lag causes a delay (sometimes of several seconds) between the focus stealing event and the newly focused window displaying on the screen.

Security issues 
Focus stealing can cause damage, as users may, while typing when their attention is away from the screen, inadvertently agree to a program doing something that causes damage. For example, when Microsoft Windows pops up the Disk Cleanup wizard, the user may "agree" to deleting files without realizing that the wizard was waiting for input. Focus stealing can also occasion security breaches, for example, when a user enters a password and the typed password appears instead in a new instant-messaging window in an unmasked input field.

Alternatives to focus stealing 
There are a number of alternative methods for grabbing the attention of the user that can be used instead of focus stealing:
 Pulse the application's icon in the task bar, leaving the application in the background
 Output a message to the notification area
 Pulsate the display over scan area
 Use an audible alerting framework

Affected systems

X Window Managers 
The following window manager systems allow focus stealing:
 9wm - fails the launch test, giving focus to window placement facility
 compiz - configurable, and capable of passing both the launch test and the JavaScript test
 fvwm - configurable, and capable of passing or failing both the launch test and the JavaScript test
 IceWM - fails the launch test, giving focus to newly started applications
 oroboros - fails the launch test, giving focus to newly started applications

Microsoft Windows 
Microsoft Windows-based systems use pop-up dialogue boxes which can steal focus from the current application. On versions of Microsoft Windows prior to Windows 7, there is a user setting that will by default prevent a cooperative application from stealing focus when launching another program or popping up a new window or dialogue box. This same method does not work in Windows 7 or later.

MacOS X 
Apple MacOS X systems also switch applications from background to foreground when the background applications uses pop-up modal dialogs. Example of this behavior is Google Chrome using alert dialog, as documented in

Web browsers 
The following web browsers allow focus stealing via a this.focus() JavaScript facility:
 Mozilla Firefox
 Debian Iceweasel
 Debian Iceape
 Chrome
 Chromium Edge

Focus-stealing detection programs 
Programs have been written to identify what is stealing focus.

 Process Explorer

See also 
 Focus
 Mode (user interface)
 Window

References

External links
 Coding Horror: Please Don't Steal My Focus
 Microsoft's PowerToys for Windows XP The TweakUI utility has a setting to prevent programs from stealing the focus.

Graphical user interfaces